David Walton (born October 26, 1975) is an American science fiction and fantasy writer living in Philadelphia.  His novel Terminal Mind won the 2008 Philip K. Dick Award for the best paperback science fiction novel published in the United States, in a tie with Adam-Troy Castro's novel Emissaries from the Dead.

Career
After years of short story writing, Walton published his award-winning novel Terminal Mind in 2008, followed by Quintessence and its sequel Quintessence Sky in 2013 and Superposition and its sequel Supersymmetry in 2015. The rights to a TV adaptation of the Superposition series was sold in late 2015.

Awards
 2018 John W. Campbell Memorial Award for Best Science Fiction Novel - for "The Genius Plague"
 2009 Philip K. Dick Award (tie) - for best original paperback of the year "Terminal Mind"
 2008 Jim Baen Memorial Award - for short story "Letting Go"

Bibliography

Novels

Short fiction 

Stories

 "Anyone Can Whistle", Electric Wine, 2001
 "All About Eventualities", Neverworlds, 2002
 "Hands", Aoife's Kiss, 2004
 "All The Rage This Year", All The Rage This Year, Phobos Books, 2004
 "No Forwarding Address", Anotherealm, 2005
 "The Problem of Friction", Lenox Avenue, 2005
 "Diamond Dust", Futurismic, 2005
 "Anyone Can Whistle", Escape Pod, 2006
 "Rival of Mars", Analog Science Fiction and Fact, 2006
 "The Towers of St. Michael's", Futurismic, 2007
 "When Peace and Redemption Collide", Continuum SF, 2007
 "Raven Crumbling", Fantastical Visions anthology, 2007
 "Mattie's Cougar", Touched by Wonder anthology, Meadowhawk Press, 2007
 "Permission to Speak Freely", Analog Science Fiction and Fact, 2007
 "Rings of Jupiter", Talebones, 2008
 "Letting Go", Jim Baen's Universe, Cosmos, 2008
 "Dragonfly Savior", Fantastical Visions anthology, 2009

Critical studies and reviews of Walton's work
Superposition

References

External links

Interview at Tor.com

 The story behind Quintessence - Online Essay by David Walton
 

1975 births
Living people
21st-century American novelists
American fantasy writers
American male novelists
American science fiction writers
21st-century American male writers